Stade (German: Bahnhof or Haltestelle Stade) is a railway station which opened in 1881  and is located in the town of Stade, Lower Saxony, Germany. Stade station is the terminus for the rapid transit trains of Hamburg S-Bahn line S3 from Pinneberg via Hamburg-Altona station and central station, and a through station for the Metronom line from Hamburg to Cuxhaven. For the Metronom, Stade is the last station within the Hamburger Verkehrsverbund (HVV).

Service  
The following trains call at Stade station:

 Hamburg S-Bahn : hourly service to 

In addition, the Moor Express heritage railway provides weekend-only service in the summer to Bremen Hauptbahnhof.

See also 
 List of Hamburg S-Bahn stations

References

External links
 
 Line and route network plans, hvv.de 

Station
Hamburg S-Bahn stations in Lower Saxony
Railway stations in Lower Saxony
Buildings and structures in Stade (district)
Railway stations in Germany opened in 1881